Lemurs of Madagascar is a 2010 reference work and field guide for the lemurs of Madagascar, giving descriptions and biogeographic data for the known species.  The primary contributor is Russell Mittermeier, president of Conservation International, and the cover art and illustrations were drawn by Stephen D. Nash.  Currently in its third edition, the book provides details about all known lemur species, general information about lemurs and their history, and also helps travelers identify species they may encounter.  Four related pocket field guides have also been released, containing color illustrations of each species, miniature range maps, and species checklists.

The first edition was reviewed favorably in the International Journal of Primatology, Conservation Biology, and Lemur News.  Reviewers, including Alison Jolly, praised the book for its meticulous coverage of each species, numerous high-quality illustrations, and engaging discussion of lemur topics, including conservation, evolution, and the recently extinct subfossil lemurs.  Each agreed that the book was an excellent resource for a wide audience, including ecotourists and lemur researchers.  A lengthy review of the second edition was published in the American Journal of Primatology, where it received similar favorable comments, plus praise for its updates and enhancements. The third edition was reviewed favorably in Lemur News; the reviewer praised the expanded content of the book, but was concerned that the edition was not as portable as its predecessors.

The first edition identified 50 lemur species and subspecies, compared to 71 in the second edition and 101 in the third.  The taxonomy promoted by these books has been questioned by researchers, such as Ian Tattersall, who view these growing numbers of lemur species as insufficiently justified inflation of species numbers (taxonomic inflation).

Overview 
Lemurs of Madagascar is published by Conservation International (CI), a non-profit conservation organization headquartered near Washington, D.C., and is intended as a field guide that identifies all of the known lemur species from Madagascar.  The first edition of Lemurs of Madagascar was published in 1994 and contained 356 pages.  The 520-page second edition was published in 2006 and is now officially out of print, having been followed by the 767-page third edition in the fall of 2010.

For all three editions, Stephen D. Nash, winner of the 2004 American Society of Primatologists President's Award, has been the illustrator and front cover artist.  The lead author for all three editions is Russell A. Mittermeier, president of CI and a well-published primatologist, herpetologist and biological anthropologist. In the first edition, four other authors were also listed: Ian Tattersall, a curator in the Division of Anthropology at the American Museum of Natural History; William R. Konstant, the Director of Conservation and Science at the Houston Zoo; David M. Meyers, a researcher and conservationist who has worked with CI, the World Wildlife Fund, and other conservation and development organizations; and Roderic B. Mast, marine biologist, primatologist, and the founding Director of CI's Madagascar Program.

The second edition was authored by Mittermeier, Konstant, Tattersall, and Meyers, as well as seven new authors: Frank Hawkins, the Technical Director for CI in Madagascar; Edward E. Louis, Jr., the conservation geneticist for Omaha's Henry Doorly Zoo's Center for Conservation and Research; Olivier Langrand, CI's Senior Vice President for Africa and Madagascar; Jonah H. Ratsimbazafy, the Scientific Coordinator for the Durrell Wildlife Conservation Trust - Madagascar Program; Rodin Rasoloarison, a field researcher and research coordinator at the German Primate Center; Jörg U. Ganzhorn, professor in the Department of Animal Ecology and Conservation at the University of Hamburg and Chairman for the Madagascar section of the IUCN Species Survival Commission (IUCN/SSC) Primate Specialist Group since 1998; and Serge Rajaobelina, the President of Fanamby, a Malagasy non-governmental environmental organization.

The list of authors changed again with the third edition.  Returning authors included Mittermeier, Louis, Langrand, Hawkins, Rajaobelina, Ratsimbazafy, and Rasoloarison.  New authors included Matthew Richardson, writer and member of the IUCN/SSC Primate Specialist Group; Christoph Schwitzer, the Head of Research at the Bristol Zoo Gardens; Anthony Rylands, a Senior Research Scientist at Conservation International and Deputy Chair of the IUCN/SSC Primate Specialist Group; Christian Roos, a geneticist at the German Primate Center; Peter M. Kappeler, a Professor of Sociobiology and Anthropology at the University of Göttingen in Germany; and James MacKinnon, the Senior Technical Director of Conservation International in Madagascar.

The first edition followed a 1982 volume by Tattersall, entitled Primates of Madagascar.  As a field guide, the Lemurs of Madagascar is "more portable and affordable," while offering updated information to assist lemur researchers and tourists in the identification of lemur species and subspecies, according to a 1996 review published in Lemur News. All three editions cover the natural history and conservation status for each known species.  They also discuss conservation strategies, lemur origins, extinct lemurs, and the history of discoveries made by early European naturalists.  The books provide suggestions on where to see each species, as well as checklists to help people keep track of their sightings.  The purpose of the book is defined in the "Introduction" as follows:

Four pocket field guides have also been published by CI, intended strictly to help people identify lemurs in the field by providing over 100 species illustrations.  All illustrations, including the detailed cover art, were drawn by Nash.  Checklists for their respective lemur species are included with these guides, along with thumbnail range maps for each species.  The four pocket guides include two editions of Lemurs of Madagascar Pocket Identification Guide (out of print), Nocturnal Lemurs, and Diurnal and Cathemeral Lemurs.  The Nocturnal Lemurs booklet contains 65 species from eight genera.  Diurnal and Cathemeral Lemurs hosts 34 species and subspecies from seven genera, along with illustrations to show male and female fur color differences in the genus Eulemur and color morphs for the indri and ruffed lemur species.  A fifth and sixth pocket field guides are planned following the publication of the third edition of the field guide.

Content 

In the second and third editions, the inside of the front and back covers include a quick visual reference, with color-coded illustrations for each lemur type and colored tabs to help locate their corresponding sections.

The "Introduction" in the first two editions was written by Peter A. Seligmann, Chairman of the Board and CEO of CI, and Mittermeier.  In the third edition, the "Introduction" was written only by Mittermeier.  In it, they emphasize the richness of Madagascar's primate diversity, summarize the conservation efforts and opportunities for preserving that diversity, and highlight recent discoveries, while also acknowledging the need for additional research.  The chapter entitled "Origins of Lemurs" ("Origin of the Lemurs" in the third edition) briefly summarizes the theories on how lemurs came to Madagascar and the difficulty in resolving the mystery.  "Discovery and Study of the Living Lemurs" reviews the history of exploration, field research, and taxonomic nomenclature of lemurs, starting from the 1625 description of a ring-tailed lemur to contemporary research by Western and Malagasy scientists.  "The Extinct Lemurs" discusses the recently extinct subfossil lemurs, including the monkey lemurs, sloth lemurs, and koala lemurs.  "Conservation of Lemurs" details the threats lemurs face, such as habitat destruction and hunting for bushmeat,  and conservation efforts aimed at their protection, from the in-situ and ex-situ programs of the Madagascar Fauna Group to the promise by Madagascar's former president Marc Ravalomanana to triple the country's protected areas over five years, known as the Durban Vision.  In the third edition, a new chapter was added, entitled "Madagascar's Ancient Geological History", written by Maarten de Wit from the University of Cape Town.  In it, three billion years of geological and biological history are explored in detail.

The majority of the book, including the chapter "The Living Lemurs" and separate sections on each taxonomic group of lemur, providing detailed accounts of all lemur species known up until the time of publication, from the tiny mouse lemurs to the large indri and diademed sifaka.  In the first and second editions, the chapter "The Living Lemurs" is broken first into sections on families, and then into species clumped together by genus.  In the third edition, each family is assigned its own chapter number, separate from "The Living Lemurs" chapter, yet the order and layout are the same.  In the second and third editions, all pages within each family section are assigned a colored tab to match those in the quick visual reference inside the covers. Each species subsection has a distribution map, an illustration or photo (if available), a list of common names in multiple languages (including Malagasy), and species information broken into five sections: "Identification", "Geographic Range", "Natural History", "Conservation Status", and "Where to See It".

The "Identification" section for each species provides descriptive information to help identify and distinguish species, including a detailed physical description, discussions of variation in size and coloration (morphometrics), and descriptions of distinguishing vocalizations.  "Geographic Range" offers textual information to accompany the provided distribution map, although the authors note that ranges change due to habitat destruction and that species may be found in new localities outside of their known range.  "Natural History" summarizes what is known about the behavior and ecology of each species, such as the unusual feeding strategies of the aye-aye or the nest-building behavior of the ruffed lemurs.  Estimated populations densities and distributions, life histories, diet, social structure, and other details are provided when known.  For many species, little information is given due to a lack of research, while others have been studied extensively allowing for more elaborate detail.  "Conservation Status" lists the IUCN Red List of Threatened Species assessment and protected areas in which a species can be found, while also discussing specific threats to each species, the effects of local fady (taboos), the future outlook for species survival, and its coverage within protected areas. Lastly, "Where to See It" aims to promote ecotourism by helping travelers find the best lemur watching sites that can be reached quickly and with the least effort.  Suggested modes of transportation are sometimes mentioned as well.

The appendices differ between editions.  The first edition has two appendices.  The first is entitled "Lemurs Present in Protected Areas" and discusses each region and domain of Madagascar while also providing basic information and lemur species content for each protected area.  The second appendix, "Alternative Names for Towns and Sites in Madagascar" spells out a few alternative French and Malagasy names for some of the larger town and cities in Madagascar.  In the second and third editions, Appendix A, "Maps of Madagascar", contains color maps that help locate towns, protected areas, topography, rivers, forest cover, regions, and lemur watching sites.  Appendix B, entitled "Biogeographic Regions and Floristic Domains of Madagascar" discusses the regions and domains of Madagascar.  Appendix C, "Key Sites for Watching Lemurs", covers characteristics and highlights of individual national parks, reserves, and regions for lemur watching. The third edition added Appendix D, entitled "Primate-watching and Primate Life-listing".  In it, primate-watching and primate life-listing (the act of recording personal first sightings of a species) are promoted while their benefits to conservation are discussed.

All three editions provide a "References" section, with the second edition listing approximately 500 scientific papers, books, reports, and dissertations used in the creation of the book.  The number of references jumped to over 1,100 in the third edition.  Following the "References", the first edition provides a section with the color plates.  In contrast, the second and third editions provides color illustrations throughout the book.

Reviews 
In a 1996 review of the first edition in the International Journal of Primatology, Lisa Gould spoke favorably of the book, citing passages about lemur descriptions from the 17th and 18th centuries that she found entertaining and informative.  She was particularly fascinated with Chapter four, "The Extinct Lemurs", and the reconstructions by Nash that accompanied the descriptions of morphology, behavior, and diet.  She praised Nash's artwork as being one of the most enjoyable aspects of the book.  The book was hailed as an excellent source for identifying lemur species for both tourists and researchers.  The book was also briefly reviewed in College & Research Libraries News by George Eberhart in April 1996.  The review noted Conservation International's promotion of ecotourism while also providing a count of the book's illustrations: 35 color plates, 50 distribution maps, and 135 drawings of postures and behaviors.

In the 1996 edition (volume 2) of Lemur News, Alison Jolly praised the first edition for its "contribution to knowledge in general" and "its effect on its intended audience."  Like Gould, Jolly praised the work as a field guide, as well as Nash's high-quality illustrations.  She noted the attraction of Nash's subfossil lemur reconstruction, claiming that it was "rapidly becoming one of the most pirated single book illustration on the primate lecture-slide circuit."  Jolly went on to praise the thoroughness of the natural history information provided for each species, including recently described species, noting that the information covered existing knowledge better than any other published literature, even when only a single paragraph was provided for poorly known species.  The book was recommended not only for lemur specialists, but also for tourists, hoping it would spark an interest in ecotourism in impoverished Madagascar.  The checklist of species, as well as the information on where to most easily spot them, earned a special mention from Jolly, who could only boast seeing 30 of the 50 known species at that time.  Finally, the "most significant and most appreciative" audience Jolly mentioned was the Malagasy researchers, to whom Mittermeier reportedly gave 50 copies of the book during a workshop in 1995.

In a 1997 review from Conservation Biology by Joelisoa Ratsirarson, the book was referred to as a "remarkable achievement" for its up-to-date information, and for being the first comprehensive lemur field guide.  Emphasizing many of the same highlights as Gould and Jolly, he went on to note the inclusion of captive management information, unpublished details, and the use of common names in English, French, German, and Malagasy.  His critique focused on the organization of the illustrations in relation to the text, the lack of an index, and a desire for more information about the roles lemurs play in their ecosystem.  Though he praised it for being useful to tourists, researchers, students, resource managers, and conservationists, he expressed concern over its lack of availability in the bookstores of Madagascar.

The completely revised second edition of Lemurs of Madagascar was reviewed in detail in the American Journal of Primatology by Stacey Tecot.  Each chapter, section, and appendix was thoroughly summarized, and as with the reviews of previous editions, the chapter on subfossil lemurs was noted as one of the more "fascinating" parts of the book, particularly due to its colorful and informative illustrations.  Although the book received only praise, Tecot did suggest two additions for the next edition: the need for information about the processes of island biogeography and expansion on captive conservation programs aside from the Duke Lemur Center, particularly at the Lemur Conservation Foundation and St. Catherines Island.  A subject index was also recommended, along with better referencing of the figures and illustrations.  Otherwise, the book was praised as being better than other field guides due to its inclusion of seemingly obscure yet important details, such as how to get to lemur watching sites, travel time, where to stay, mentions of lesser-known sites, listings of species to be seen, best times to observe, and even, among other things, the number of habituated lemur groups in each area.  Tecot noted that the lemur checklist promoted competitive lemur watching, similar to birdwatching, and that the color-coded sections assisted in "on-the-fly species identification."   Although very satisfied with the information provided for each species, Tecot commended the promise made in this edition to more extensively cover the published literature in the upcoming third edition.  Like its predecessor, the second edition was praised as an excellent tool for ecotourists and researchers.  It was also noted for its attempt to promote ecotourism as a conservation strategy.

This newer edition was also mentioned briefly in the 2006 edition (volume 11) of Lemur News.  The publication announcement highlighted the extensive coverage of scientific information throughout a range of chapters and appendices.  The edition is said to contain over 200 illustrations, including drawings, photos, and maps.

The 2010 third edition was reviewed in Lemur News by Alex Dunkel. He praised the increased level of detail in the new edition, which adds additional information on geology, the history of lemur research, and numerous aspects of lemur biology. Efforts to conserve lemurs have faced steep challenges, Dunkel wrote, due to political and economic instability in Madagascar, and these challenges make the new edition especially important. However, he worried that the increased size of the book made it less portable than its predecessors.

Impact on lemur taxonomy

While the first edition recognized 50 lemur taxa (32 species and 25 subspecies), the second edition recognized 71 lemur taxa (68 species and 5 subspecies) just 12 years later.  The second edition followed the recommendations of Colin Groves in the third edition of Mammal Species of the World from 2005 by recognizing newly identified nocturnal species and raising many former subspecies to species status.  For comparison, Tattersall's book Primates of Madagascar from 1982 listed only 20 species and 29 subspecies.  Following the publication of the second edition, Nick Garbutt recognized 87 species and 5 subspecies in his book Mammals of Madagascar.

Not all lemur researchers agree with the species promotions supported by these books. Researchers such as Tattersall and Anne D. Yoder, director of the Duke Lemur Center, have raised concerns about taxonomic inflation.  In particular, Tattersall has noted a steep decline in polytypic lemur species, or species with defined subspecies, starting with the first edition of Lemurs of Madagascar and becoming more pronounced in the second edition.  He noted that more than half of the new species added in the second edition were promoted subspecies and questioned whether Madagascar could produce so many monotypic species.

Prior to the release of the third edition of Lemurs of Madagascar, many of the major contributors, as well as Colin Groves, teamed up in 2008 to compile an updated lemur species list, published under the title "Lemur diversity in Madagascar" in the International Journal of Primatology.  In it, 99 lemur taxa were recognized (97 species and 3 subspecies).  The third edition went on to recognize 101 lemur taxa (97 species and 6 subspecies) and suggested that future research could reveal as many as 110 to 125 taxa.

References 

Books cited

 
 
 

2010 non-fiction books
Primatology

Zoology books
English-language books